Truchas, Spanish for "trout" (plural), may refer to:

Truchas, León
Truchas, New Mexico
Truchas Peak, peak in New Mexico